Chemical King is the name of two characters in the DC Comics universe. The first was Mr. Lambert, who was murdered under the direction of Alfred Stryker in "The Case of the Chemical Syndicate", the feature story of Detective Comics #27. The second character named Chemical King was a member of the Legion of Super-Heroes in the 30th century.

Fictional character biography
Chemical King was born Condo Arlik on the planet Phlon, the son of Darvon Arlik, (though some sources state he is from the planet Valdow). He is a mutant with power to act as a human catalyst; he can slow down or speed up chemical reactions.

Chemical King's name is first mentioned in the "Adult Legion" story in Adventure Comics #354, where it is engraved on a memorial statue which read that Chemical King had died sacrificing his life to prevent World War VII. The adult Legion stories were believed to be true glimpses of the Legion's future, and it was not until years later that they were revealed to belong to a different possible timeline.

In Chemical King's full debut (Adventure Comics #371), he is a member of the Legion Academy and works undercover to infiltrate the Legion of Super-Villains. After graduating alongside Timber Wolf, he becomes a full Legion member in Adventure Comics #372 (September 1968). Chemical King appears in few subsequent stories afterwards. Plagued with self-doubts over the relative usefulness of his powers, he dies in Superboy and the Legion of Super-Heroes #228 (June 1977), when he sacrifices his life to stop Deregon, a Dark Circle agent and the governor of Australia, from starting World War VII, thus fulfilling the prophecy of his first posthumous appearance.

Later the sorcerer Mordru resurrects Chemical King along with millions of other corpses as part of a plan to conquer the universe. The "zombie" Chemical King displays limited imagination with his abilities, igniting pockets of methane gas and starting fires. He is readily disposed of.

Post Zero Hour
In post-Zero Hour continuity, he first appears in Legionnaires #59 (April 1998) then again in issue #64 (September 1998). He is not a Legionnaire, but instead works as a reporter. According to the Encyclopedia of the DC Universe he was supposed to be in a relationship with Invisible Kid, but this was never verified in the comic. This version of the character has dark skin, instead of the Caucasian skin of the pre-Zero Hour version.

Post-Infinite Crisis
The events of the Infinite Crisis miniseries have apparently restored a close analogue of the Pre-Crisis on Infinite Earths Legion to continuity, as seen in "The Lightning Saga" story arc in Justice League of America and Justice Society of America and in the "Superman and the Legion of Super-Heroes" story arc in Action Comics.  In Final Crisis: Legion of 3 Worlds #1, an image of Condo alongside Invisible Kid and Ferro Lad can be seen in the Superman Museum, confirming that he is still dead.

In the Legion Academy storyline featured in Adventure Comics (beginning with #523), one of the Academy trainees is a native of Phlon named Hadru Jamik, a.k.a. Chemical Kid, whose father used a genetic modification based on Condo Arlik's mutation to grant Hadru the same abilities. The elder Jamik is later forced to give the same modification to a female criminal named Queega Semk to cover his illegal gambling debts. Semk, now calling herself Alchemical Girl, then attempts to force further accommodations out of Jamik using strongarm tactics, only to be beaten and captured by Chemical Kid and his fellow Academy trainees; Semk's genetic modification is then stripped from her by the magics of Academy trainee Glorith. Following the events of Flashpoint, Chemical Kid and other Academy students become full members of the Legion, as replacements for Legion members believed deceased.

Powers and abilities
Chemical King is a mutant with the power to act as a human catalyst. He can speed up or slow down any chemical reaction; for example, he can cause iron to rapidly rust, or even burst into flames from rapid oxidation. His powers can affect the chemical reactions in the human body, rendering an opponent unconscious from shock, but take several seconds and can only focus on a single opponent at a time. Late in his career, Chemical King displayed the ability to change energy reaction rates as well, causing batteries to lose power and force fields to decay. As the final act before his death, he used his powers to alter and absorb vast amounts of radiation capable of paralyzing Superboy.

Equipment
As a member of the Legion of Super-Heroes, he is provided a Legion Flight Ring. It allows him to fly and protects him from the vacuum of space and other dangerous environments.

In other media

 Chemical King makes a cameo appearance in the Legion of Super Heroes (2006) series finale "Dark Victory".
 Chemical King appears in the animated film Legion of Super-Heroes (2023), voiced by Eric Lopez.

References

External links

Chemical King at Legion of Super-Heroes fan site
A Hero History Of Chemical King
Gay League Profile: Condo Arlik

DC Comics aliens
DC Comics metahumans
DC Comics superheroes
Fictional gay males
Comics characters introduced in 1968
Characters created by Jim Shooter
Characters created by Curt Swan
DC Comics LGBT superheroes
DC Comics extraterrestrial superheroes